Hongguang (28 January – 17 August 1645) was the era name of the Hongguang Emperor of the Southern Ming.

On 7 June 1644 (Chongzhen 17, 3th day of the 5th month), Zhu Yousong was proclaimed "regent" (監國) in Nanjing and ascended the throne on 19 June (15th day of the 5th month), taking next year Hongguang 1  (弘光元年, "the first year of the Hongguang era"). On May 1645 (5th month), the Qing army conquered Nanjing, and Zhu Yousong  was captured on 15 June (22th day of the 5th month). On 18 August 1645 (27th day of the leap 6th month), the Longwu Emperor ascended to the throne and continued to use. The era was changed to Longwu in the following month. On 24 August (4th day of the 7th month), Zhu Yihai, Prince of Lu, was proclaimed "regent" and still using the Hongguang era name, but changing the era to Jianguo Lu 1 (監國魯元年, "the first year of the Jianguo Lu era") in the following year.

Comparison table
The Gānzhī of each month on the right side of the table was the first day of each month. "(Long)" means that the month has 30 days, and "(Short)" means that the month has 29 days. The numbers in the "leap month" table indicate the X leap month of that year, and the numbers below the first day of each month indicate the corresponding Western calendar date.

Other regime era names that existed during the same period
 China
 Shunzhi (順治, 1644–1661): Qing dynasty — era name of the Shunzhi Emperor
 Yongchang (永昌, 1644–1645): Shun dynasty — era name of Li Zicheng
 Dashun (大順, 1644–1646): Xi dynasty — era name of Zhang Xianzhong
 Vietnam
 Phúc Thái (福泰, 1643–1649): Later Lê dynasty — era name of Lê Chân Tông
 Thuận Đức (順德, 1638–1677): Mạc dynasty — era name of Mạc Kính Vũ
 Japan
 Shōhō (正保, 1644–1648): era name of Emperor Go-Kōmyō

See also
 List of Chinese era names
 List of Ming dynasty era names

References

Further reading

Southern Ming eras